Robert Henry Dollin (6 December 1928 – 5 November 2021) was an Australian politician.

Dollin was born at Kyogle in New South Wales, and worked as a manager in the timber industry before entering politics. A member of the Labor Party, he was a delegate to the Queensland state council. In 1989 he was elected to the Queensland Legislative Assembly as the member for Maryborough. He served on the backbenches until 1998, when he was defeated by a One Nation candidate.

Dollin died on 5 November 2021 at St Stephen's Hospital in Hervey Bay, Queensland, at the age of 92. He was survived by his wife, Verlie, and their five children, Stephen, Stewie, Maree, Michelle and Katrina.

References

1928 births
2021 deaths
Members of the Queensland Legislative Assembly
People from New South Wales
Australian Labor Party members of the Parliament of Queensland